Gaston Ruter (2 November 1898 – 2 November 1979) was a French entomologist.
He studied the Coleoptera Cetoniidae.

Life 
A short notice was published by Paulian & Decarpentries

An amateur entomologist, he was always interested in the Coleoptera fauna of France, of which he had a large collection, especially microcoleoptera, for which he accurately prepared the tiny genitalia.

He first studied the Curculionidae of the genus Bagous. Then, with the help of Bourgoin, his research became focused on the study of exotic Cetonids.

His collection is housed at the National Museum of Natural History in Paris.

Works 
The list of his publications was given later by Menier.

There is one work missing.

In fact he published relatively little compared to all of his discoveries. A number of taxa remained in litteris.

His descriptions were always very detailed, along with many figures and references.

Reward
He was elected president of the Société entomologique de France in 1956.

Taxa 
A list of 74 of the taxa he described, fully referenced, is given elsewhere

Entomological terms named after him 

 Acalles ruteri Roudier, 1954
 Agrilus ruteri Descarpentries & Villiers, 1963
 Alleucosma ruteri Antoine, 1989
 Amaurina ruteri Antoine, 2000
 Ancyrophorus ruteri Jarrige 1949
 Aphelorhina neumanni ruteri Allard, 1986
 Arachnodes ruteri Lebis, 1953
 Astenus ruteri Lecoq, 1996
 Athous ruteri Chassain, 1985
 Bothrorrhina ruteri Lisle, 1953
 Calais ruteri Girard 1968
 Clinteria ducalis ruteri Paulian 1960
 Coelocorynus ruteri Antoine, 2003
 Coelorrhina ruteri De Lisle, 1953
 Coenochilus ruteri Schein, 1954
 Colpodes ruteri Morvan, 1972
 Cyprolais ruteri Lisle, 1953
 Dinosius ruteri Ferragu 1986
 Entomoderus ruteri Roudier, 1954
 Euselates rufipes ruteri Miksic, 1971
 Goliathus ruteri Endrodi, 1960
 Haematonotus ruteri Basilewsky, 1956
 Heteroderes ruteri Chassain, 1978
 Hoplopyga ruteri Antoine 2008
 Ischiopsopha ruteri Allard, 1995
 Laparocerus ruteri Roudier, 1957
 Leucocelis ruteri Antoine, 2000
 Mausoleopsis amabilis ruteri Antoine, 1989
 Mycterophallus ruteri Alexis & Delpont, 2000
 Ochthephilus ruteri Jarrige, 1949
 Oedichirus ruteri Lecoq, 1986
 Pachnoda aemula ruteri Villiers, 1950
 Peritelus ruteri Péricart, 1963
 Plaesiorrhina ruteri Lisle, 1953
 Porphyronota ruteri Gomes Alves, 1973
 Proictes ruteri Ferragu 1978
 Protaetia ruteri Paulian, 1959
 Pseudalleucosma ruteri Antoine, 1998
 Pseudomeira ruteri Roudier, 1954
 Rhinocoeta ruteri Basilewsky, 1956
 Ruteria Jarrige, 1957
 Scheinia ruteri Krikken, 1977
 Stenotarsia ruteri Paulian, 1991
 Stephanorrhina neumanni ruteri Allard, 1986
 Tafaia ruteri Arnaud, 1982
 Tephraea ruteri Basilewsky 1956
 Trechus grenieri ruteri Colas & A. Gaudin, 1935
 Urodon rufipes ruteri Hoffmann, 1950
 Xestagonum ruteri  Morvan, 1972

References

1898 births
1979 deaths
French entomologists
Presidents of the Société entomologique de France
Coleopterists
20th-century French zoologists